The Hochberg is a mountain in Baden-Württemberg, Germany. It is one of the "ten thousanders."

Mountains and hills of the Swabian Jura
One-thousanders of Germany